97 Street is a major arterial road in north Edmonton, Alberta.  It is used to take vehicles in and out of Downtown Edmonton to the city's northern suburban neighbourhoods and to the region's main military installation, CFB Edmonton. North of Yellowhead Trail (Highway 16), it is designated as part of Highway 28.

The road has existed in some form since Edmonton was a small agricultural community. At its southern terminus it connects with Jasper Avenue, early Edmonton's main street, at the location of the Edmonton Convention Centre and Canada Place the main federal government offices in Alberta since 1988 and the former site of the Alberta Hotel.  Proceeding north, 97 Street passes the Francis Winspear Centre for Music, and the Law Courts, as well as the Chinatown gate in Chinatown and Little Italy. Like all early roads in eastern Edmonton, Namao Avenue as it was called, ran at a slight angle to a true north–south line, being more NNW-SSE.  During later development (north of 110A Avenue) it switches to a straight north–south course.

The neighbourhood along the west side, between 137 and 153 Avenues, Griesbach, used to be designated for homes for the families of the base. This has since been redeveloped by the Canada Lands Company. 97 Street is still used as the Canadian Forces parade to the base upon return of duty of the troops. A portion of 97 street between 137 Avenue and Anthony Henday Drive has been given the honorary name, " Canadian Forces Trail" and was approved in 2018, the proposal submitted by Ward 3 City Councillor Jon Dziadyk. This has prompted the light standards being tied with yellow ribbons and the street nicknamed Heroes Boulevard. This honorary name was the idea of local dentist Randy Crowell as a tribute to all past and present members of Edmontons' military family. 10,000 names were gathered through radio media outlets and presented to City Hall in support of the Heroes Boulevard tribute.

Neighbourhoods
List of neighbourhoods 94 street  in order from south to north.
Boyle Street
Central McDougall
McCauley
Spruce Avenue
Alberta Avenue
Westwood
Delton
Killarney
Lauderdale
Glengarry
Rosslyn
Northmount
Griesbach
Evansdale
Beaumaris
Eaux Claires
Lorelei
Baturyn
Lago Lindo
Elsinore

Major intersections
This is a list of major intersections, starting at the south end of 97 Street.

See also 

 List of streets in Edmonton
 Transportation in Edmonton

References

Roads in Edmonton